The Deep Creek Furnace Site is a historic colonial industrial site in rural Sussex County, Delaware, near the community of Middleford. The Deep Creek Furnace is one of the two oldest blast furnaces (along with Pine Grove) established in what is now southern Delaware for processing bog iron into wrought iron. It was established by Jonathan Vaughn, who came from Pennsylvania and began acquiring land for it c. 1763. Vaughn apparently operated the facilities until the outbreak of the American Revolutionary War, in which he served in the Continental Army.

The site was listed on the National Register of Historic Places in 1977.

See also
National Register of Historic Places listings in Sussex County, Delaware

References

Archaeological sites on the National Register of Historic Places in Delaware
Sussex County, Delaware
National Register of Historic Places in Sussex County, Delaware